These American television shows premiered or are scheduled to premiere in 2023. The premiere dates may change depending on a variety of factors.

Shows

Television films and specials
These television films and specials premiered or are scheduled to premiere in 2023. The premiere dates may be changed depending on a variety of factors.

Miniseries
This listing consists of shows classified as miniseries, limited series, or limited docuseries premiering in 2023. The premiere dates may change depending on a variety of factors.

References

2023 in American television
2023-related lists
Mass media timelines by year